Kieve can mean:
 Kieve, Müritz, a municipality in the Müritz district, in Mecklenburg-Vorpommern, Germany
 St Nectan's Kieve, a waterfall and pool near Tintagel, Cornwall

See also
 Keeve (disambiguation)
 Kiev (disambiguation)